Phyllodrepa is a genus of beetles belonging to the family Staphylinidae.

The species of this genus are found in Europe and Northern America.

Species:
 Phyllodrepa alutacea (Fauvel, 1878)
 Phyllodrepa angelinii Zanetti, 2012

References

Staphylinidae
Staphylinidae genera